Mirko Šugić (born 25 April 1994) is a Croatian footballer currently playing as a midfielder for Tanjong Pagar United.

Club career 
He played a couple of friendly matches for Austrian side Ilzer SV, just before the 2020 COVID-19 pandemic kicked in.

Tanjong Pagar United 
Šugić made the move to the Singapore Premier League side after he was recommended by Dragan Talajić, who played as a goalkeeper for Tanjong Pagar from 1997–2001 and won the Singapore Cup in 1998. Prior to joining the Jaguars, he was plying his trade in the Croatian second tier with NK Dubrava. Šugić grabbed his first assist for his new club in less than a minute into his competitive debut, finding teammate Reo Nishiguchi just inside the box who chested the ball and unleashed a volley into the back of the net in just 47 seconds of the game. Šugić grabbed his first two goals to help his team to a 5-3 win over Balestier Khalsa, with his first an acrobatic effort that bulged the net before sweeping home after a melee at a corner kick for his second. His performances in the opening rounds of the season saw him win the Player of the Month award for March 2022.

Career statistics

Club

References 

1994 births
Living people
People from Nova Gradiška
Association football defenders
Croatian footballers
NK Vrapče players
NK HAŠK players
NK Dubrava players
NK Kustošija players
Tanjong Pagar United FC players
First Football League (Croatia) players
Singapore Premier League players
Croatian expatriate footballers
Expatriate footballers in Austria
Croatian expatriate sportspeople in Austria
Expatriate footballers in Singapore
Croatian expatriate sportspeople in Singapore